Breast cancer 3 is a protein that in humans is encoded by the BRCA3 gene.

References

Further reading